Katie Ka Vang is a Hmong American performance artist, poet and playwright.  She has created and written several performance pieces and plays. These include wtf, Hmong Bollywood, Meaning of Freedom; Use of Sharpening, Youth In Session, and Myth of Xee.

Vang was born in Santa Ana, California, lived in Colorado and moved to Minneapolis–Saint Paul in 1999. She attended Concordia University, where she studied marketing., then attended Brown University and graduated with an MFA in Playwriting. As a performer, Vang has appeared at numerous venues, including Theatre Mu, the Center for Hmong Arts and Talent, the Walker Art Center, Exposed Brick Theatre, Pillsbury House Theatre, Ordway Center for the Performing Arts, and as an ensemble member at Pangea World Theater.

Vang has published work in the St. Paul Almanac, Bakka Mag, Asian American Press, and Voices from the Asian American Experience.  Her self-published book of poetry and prose is Never Said.

Vang has received grants from the Jerome Foundation and the Minnesota State Arts Board.  She received a NPN Creation Fund grant to complete Hmong Bollywood. In 2012, she was awarded the Woman of the Year award; this recognized her contributions to the lives of Hmong women and the Hmong community.

Vang has worked as a program director, volunteer and teaching artist with C.H.A.T. (Center for Hmong Arts and Talent), one of the world's first Hmong arts organization.

In 2012 Vang was diagnosed with stage four anaplastic large-cell lymphoma. After going into remission, Vang put on the one-woman show Hmong Bollywood at Intermedia Arts in 2013.

References

Living people
Year of birth missing (living people)
21st-century American women artists
American performance artists
American writers of Hmong descent
Brown University alumni
Concordia University (Saint Paul, Minnesota) alumni
People from Santa Ana, California
Poets from Minnesota